Montgueux is a commune in the Aube department in north-central France.

History
According to M. Girard, the modern Maurattes plains around the town were once known as the Campus Mauriacus, and it is considered the most likely location for the Battle of the Catalaunian Plains.

Population

See also
Communes of the Aube department

References

Communes of Aube
Aube communes articles needing translation from French Wikipedia